Gracen Hirschy (born April 4, 1995) is an American ice hockey defenceman and the current head coach of the Culver Girls Academy (CGA) Eagles under-16 ice hockey team. Her college ice hockey career was played with the North Dakota Fighting Hawks women's ice hockey program in the Western Collegiate Hockey Association (WCHA) conference of the NCAA Division I. She played more than four seasons in the Swedish Women's Hockey League (SDHL) with Djurgårdens IF Hockey Dam, MODO Hockey Dam, Linköping HC Dam, and Leksands IF Dam.

Playing career 
Hirschy scored 66 points in 145 NCAA Division I games with the North Dakota Fighting Hawks women's ice hockey program and was as an alternate captain in her senior season. She was named to the WCHA All-Rookie Team in her rookie season.

Following graduation, Hirschy served as a graduate assistant coach to the Spartans women's ice hockey program of Aurora University in the Northern Collegiate Hockey Association (NCHA) conference of the NCAA Division III during the 2017–18 season.

In early March 2018, she signed with Djurgårdens IF in Sweden, earning 3 points in the last 5 regular season games of the 2017–18 SDHL season. The next year, she opted to remain in Sweden and signed with Leksands IF. She put up 19 points in 34 games for Leksands, before leaving to join MODO Hockey for the 2019-20 season. For MODO, she scored another 19 points in 35 games, as the team finished last in the SDHL. She was suspended for one game following a collision with a referee.

In July 2020, Hirschy left MODO to sign with Linköping HC.

International 
As a member of the United States national under-18 team, Hirschy participated in the 2013 IIHF U18 Women's World Championship, winning a silver medal.

Personal life 
Hirschy attended Culver Girls Academy in Culver, Indiana during her last three years of high school and played on the school's ice hockey team.

She has a degree in political science from the University of North Dakota.

Career statistics

References

External links
 

1995 births
Living people
American expatriate ice hockey players in Sweden
American women's ice hockey defensemen
Culver Academies alumni
Djurgårdens IF Hockey Dam players
Ice hockey coaches from Indiana
Ice hockey players from Indiana
Leksands IF Dam players
Linköping HC Dam players
Modo Hockey Dam players
North Dakota Fighting Hawks women's ice hockey players
Sportspeople from Fort Wayne, Indiana